Saray García García (born 5 September 1984) is a Spanish footballer who plays as a midfielder. She was previously a founding member of AD Torrejón CF.

She was a member of the Spain women's national team during the 2007 World Cup and the 2009 European Championship's qualifying stages.

Honours

Club
Rayo Vallecano
Primera División (1): 2010-2011

Madrid CFF
Segunda División (1): 2016-2017

References

External links

1984 births
Living people
Women's association football midfielders
Spanish women's footballers
Footballers from Madrid
Spain women's international footballers
Primera División (women) players
Rayo Vallecano Femenino players
Madrid CFF players
EdF Logroño players
AD Torrejón CF Femenino players
21st-century Spanish women